Susques is a rural municipality and village in Jujuy Province in Argentina.

Climate
Susques has a cool arid climate (Köppen BWk) with two seasons: a mild summer with occasional thunderstorms from December to March and a cold, rainless winter covering the remaining eight months of the year.

References

Populated places in Jujuy Province